Charles Louis Eugène Virion (Ajaccio, 1 December 1865  - Montigny-sur-Loing, 30 December 1946) was a noted French sculptor, medallist, and ceramicist, principally of animals.

Virion studied sculpture in Paris under Jean-Paul Aubé and Charles Gauthier and exhibited at the Salon des Artistes Français from 1886 until the 1930s. He was awarded a distinction in 1893 and became a member the same year. He won a third-class medal in 1895. At the Paris Exposition Universelle of 1900 he won a bronze medal. He also exhibited at the Salon des Animaliers after 1913.

After the First World War, he made memorials for several municipalities including those of Montigny-sur-Loing, Nemours, La Genevraye and Arbonne-la-Forêt.

See also
Armand Point

References

External links
 :fr:Charles Virion
http://montignysurloing.pagesperso-orange.fr/village/culture/artistes.htm#
http://www.culture.gouv.fr/public/mistral/joconde_fr?ACTION=CHERCHER&FIELD_3=AUTR&VALUE_3=%27VIRION%20Charles%20Louis%20Eug%e8ne%27&DOM=All
 

1865 births
1946 deaths
French ceramists
People from Ajaccio
Wildlife artists
19th-century French painters
20th-century French painters
20th-century French male artists
French male painters
20th-century French sculptors
19th-century French sculptors
French male sculptors
19th-century French male artists